Bevan Fransman (born 31 October 1983 in Cape Town, Western Cape) is a South African footballer, currently playing as a centre back for TS Galaxy.

He was in the South Africa squad for the 2008 African Nations Cup.

Early life
He was born in Cape Town.

Club career

Hapoel Tel Aviv
On 9 June 2010 Fransman completed the transfer to Israeli double holders for an undisclosed fee signing a 3-year contract.

International career

Honours
Israel State Cup (2):
2011, 2012

References

External links
 

1983 births
Living people
South African soccer players
South Africa international soccer players
South African expatriate soccer players
Soccer players from Cape Town
Association football central defenders
Association football midfielders
Western Province United F.C. players
Kaizer Chiefs F.C. players
Moroka Swallows F.C. players
Royal Excel Mouscron players
Maccabi Netanya F.C. players
Bloemfontein Celtic F.C. players
Hapoel Tel Aviv F.C. players
SuperSport United F.C. players
Highlands Park F.C. players
Maritzburg United F.C. players
TS Galaxy F.C. players
Israeli Premier League players
South African Premier Division players
Cape Coloureds
2008 Africa Cup of Nations players
Expatriate footballers in Israel
South African expatriate sportspeople in Israel